The 2010 Formula Abarth season was the sixth season of the former Formula Azzurra, and the first under its new guise of "Formula Abarth". It started on April 24 at Misano and finished on October 14 in Monza after fourteen races held at seven meetings.

Brandon Maïsano, part of the Ferrari Driver Academy scheme and driving for BVM – Target Racing, won the Alboreto Trophy as overall champion, taking four victories and three second places for a championship-winning margin of 22 points over runner-up Patric Niederhauser of the Jenzer Motorsport team. Niederhauser assumed second place in the standings after finishing the season strongly, taking seven top-five finishes in the final eight races including a victory at Varano and five third places. JD Motorsport driver Raffaele Marciello finished the season in third place, taking victories at Misano and Varano, with winless Jordi Cunill (Prema Junior) and Maxim Zimin (Jenzer Motorsport) taking five second places and two third places between them. Despite only competing in three meetings, Cunill's team-mate Hannes van Asseldonk finished the season in sixth place, taking three main race victories and two fifth places. Other victories went to Jenzer's Zoël Amberg, Prema's Riccardo Agostini, JD's Víctor Guerin and National Trophy competitor Simone Iaquinta of ARM Competition.

Iaquinta won the National Trophy, having won nine of the fourteen races in the class, having taken eight top-ten overall finishes including his victory at Mugello. Having started the season at RP Motorsport, Stefano Colombo ended the season as Iaquinta's team-mate, and wrapped up second place with a class second behind Iaquinta at Monza, having taken two wins during the season at Misano and the only win at Magione, as the first race saw no finishers from the National Trophy. Federico Bonamico, who entered the season at round three, finished third for Scuderia Victoria World with one victory at Vallelunga. Simone Taloni took the other victory for Winner Motorsport at Imola. Prema Junior won the Teams' Championship by six points ahead of Jenzer Motorsport.

Teams and drivers
 Drivers competing in the main Alboreto Trophy (Main championship) were numbered from 1 to 59, with drivers competing in the secondary National Trophy numbered from 71 to 99.

* Drivers who participated in the non-championship round at Spa-Francorchamps.

Race calendar and results
All rounds, excluding Magione (that was part of Italian GT Championship weekend) supported the Italian Formula Three Championship. In the view of a future international series, a non-championship round was held on the weekend of June 25–27 at Circuit de Spa-Francorchamps, supporting International GT Open, Auto GP and European F3 Open rounds.

Standings
Points were awarded as follows:

Drivers' Standings

‡ Round at Spa-Francorchamps was non-championship, no points awarded.

Teams' Standings
The person or company that entered the race application for a driver was considered Competitor P.G. or Team. In a such situation, for example, Matteo Davenia competed at Imola for Durango, physically driving a Cram Competition car. Only Competitors P.G. and Teams holding a valid ACI license for the current season were awarded points.

‡ Round at Spa-Francorchamps was non-championship, no points awarded.

References

External links
Formula Abarth

Formula Abarth
Formula Abarth
Abarth